Grey Ghost (born Jeremy Koren on 27 March 1984) is an Australian hip hop recording artist, visual artist and director from Melbourne, Australia. He performed with several bands before signing with EMI and adopting the performance name Grey Ghost.

Career 
Koren started his career under the moniker 'Jeremedy' in 2003 and was the front man of bands Debt Collector, Caveman Science, The Inflatables and most notably Art-Rap experimental five-piece The Melodics. After The Melodics broke up, Jeremedy changed his performance name to Grey Ghost and signed to EMI, bringing out his self-titled debut EP with breakthrough single Space Ambassador, followed by Black Ghost Gold Chain.

Discography

EPs

Singles

References

External links 

 

1984 births
Living people
Singers from Melbourne
21st-century Australian singers
21st-century Australian male singers